Ulf Rollof is a Swedish artist, born 1961 in Karlskrona, Sweden. He was educated at Royal University College of Fine Arts 1982–1987.

Solo exhibitions
Under at Millesgården, Lidingö, 2008 with architect Erik Andersson.
Golf of Mexico, Museo de la Ciudad, Querétaro, Mexico, 2008
7 C's', Venice Biennale, Venice Italy, 1999

External links
Ulf Rollof
Review Blaskan (Swedish)
art net

1961 births
Living people
Swedish artists